Moscow City Duma District 31 is one of 45 constituencies in Moscow City Duma. The constituency covers parts of Southern Moscow and parts of Zyuzino since 2014. In 1993-2005 District 31 was based in Western Moscow, however, after the number of constituencies was reduced to 15 in 2005, the constituency was eliminated.

Members elected

Election results

2001

|-
! colspan=2 style="background-color:#E9E9E9;text-align:left;vertical-align:top;" |Candidate
! style="background-color:#E9E9E9;text-align:left;vertical-align:top;" |Party
! style="background-color:#E9E9E9;text-align:right;" |Votes
! style="background-color:#E9E9E9;text-align:right;" |%
|-
|style="background-color:"|
|align=left|Yevgeny Gerasimov
|align=left|Independent
|
|24.01%
|-
|style="background-color:#D50000"|
|align=left|Olga Sergeyeva
|align=left|Russian Communist Workers' Party
|
|13.74%
|-
|style="background-color:"|
|align=left|Sergey Bochkov
|align=left|Independent
|
|12.25%
|-
|style="background-color:"|
|align=left|Yevgeny Shevalovsky
|align=left|Independent
|
|8.34%
|-
|style="background-color:"|
|align=left|Yury Zagrebnoy (incumbent)
|align=left|Independent
|
|8.18%
|-
|style="background-color:"|
|align=left|Vadim Isthmian
|align=left|Independent
|
|6.95%
|-
|style="background-color:"|
|align=left|Svetlana Silkina
|align=left|Independent
|
|5.06%
|-
|style="background-color:"|
|align=left|Aleksandr Gerasimov
|align=left|Independent
|
|3.99%
|-
|style="background-color:#000000"|
|colspan=2 |against all
|
|14.84%
|-
| colspan="5" style="background-color:#E9E9E9;"|
|- style="font-weight:bold"
| colspan="3" style="text-align:left;" | Total
| 
| 100%
|-
| colspan="5" style="background-color:#E9E9E9;"|
|- style="font-weight:bold"
| colspan="4" |Source:
|
|}

2014

|-
! colspan=2 style="background-color:#E9E9E9;text-align:left;vertical-align:top;" |Candidate
! style="background-color:#E9E9E9;text-align:left;vertical-align:top;" |Party
! style="background-color:#E9E9E9;text-align:right;" |Votes
! style="background-color:#E9E9E9;text-align:right;" |%
|-
|style="background-color:"|
|align=left|Sergey Zverev
|align=left|United Russia
|
|52.34%
|-
|style="background-color:"|
|align=left|Aleksandr Kurafeyev
|align=left|Communist Party
|
|14.82%
|-
|style="background-color:"|
|align=left|Varvara Gryaznova
|align=left|Yabloko
|
|13.92%
|-
|style="background-color:"|
|align=left|Oleg Sukhov
|align=left|Independent
|
|7.48%
|-
|style="background-color:"|
|align=left|Sergey Anokhin
|align=left|A Just Russia
|
|4.40%
|-
|style="background-color:"|
|align=left|Anna Novikova
|align=left|Liberal Democratic Party
|
|3.38%
|-
| colspan="5" style="background-color:#E9E9E9;"|
|- style="font-weight:bold"
| colspan="3" style="text-align:left;" | Total
| 
| 100%
|-
| colspan="5" style="background-color:#E9E9E9;"|
|- style="font-weight:bold"
| colspan="4" |Source:
|
|}

2019

|-
! colspan=2 style="background-color:#E9E9E9;text-align:left;vertical-align:top;" |Candidate
! style="background-color:#E9E9E9;text-align:left;vertical-align:top;" |Party
! style="background-color:#E9E9E9;text-align:right;" |Votes
! style="background-color:#E9E9E9;text-align:right;" |%
|-
|style="background-color:"|
|align=left|Lyubov Nikitina
|align=left|Communist Party
|
|44.22%
|-
|style="background-color:"|
|align=left|Sergey Zverev (incumbent)
|align=left|Independent
|
|29.45%
|-
|style="background-color:"|
|align=left|Andrey Mileshin
|align=left|Communists of Russia
|
|8.96%
|-
|style="background-color:"|
|align=left|Yulia Zhandarova
|align=left|A Just Russia
|
|7.89%
|-
|style="background-color:"|
|align=left|Yulia Shmantsar
|align=left|Liberal Democratic Party
|
|5.89%
|-
| colspan="5" style="background-color:#E9E9E9;"|
|- style="font-weight:bold"
| colspan="3" style="text-align:left;" | Total
| 
| 100%
|-
| colspan="5" style="background-color:#E9E9E9;"|
|- style="font-weight:bold"
| colspan="4" |Source:
|
|}

Notes

References

Moscow City Duma districts